Manan Ahmed Asif, commonly known as Manan Ahmed, is a historian of South Asia and West Asia,  who works as an associate professor at the Columbia University in New York City.

He is the founder of the South Asia blog Chapati Mystery and co-founder of Columbia's Group for Experimental Methods in Humanistic Research. Since 2021, he is co-executive editor of the Journal of the History of Ideas.

Career
Ahmed holds a BA from Punjab University, Lahore and a second from Miami University in Ohio. Ahmed earned a PhD from the University of Chicago in 2008. At Chicago, Ahmed studied under Muzaffar Alam, Fred Donner, and Ronald Inden.

Ahmed's work often combines archaeological, numismatic, epigraphic, and literary evidence and focuses on the history of South Asia.

According to Ahmed, Muslim presence in the subcontinent is not to be understood as a history of conquests or Manichean conflict (religious, military, etc.). Ahmed, argues instead, that we recognize that presence as “lived spaces” (A Book 49), interconnected with each other across the region, and full of particularities that must be understood in their own terms.

In 2014, he helped co-found Columbia's Group for Experimental Methods in Humanistic Research, which focuses on “mobilized humanities” and innovations in scholarly methodologies. One of the recent projects, Torn Apart/Separados, a series of rapidly produced data visualizations, responded to the Trump administration family separation policy announced by the United States government in 2018. The project located 113 shelters used to house children separated from their parents at the Mexico-United States Border.

Works
 2016 A Book of Conquest: The Chachnama and Muslim Origins in South Asia. Harvard University Press;  (10);  (13).
 2011 Where the Wild Frontiers Are: Pakistan and the American Imagination. Just World Publications;  (10);  (13).
 2020 The Loss of Hindustan. HUP/Harper Publications;.

References

American academics of Pakistani descent
Living people
21st-century American historians
21st-century American male writers
1971 births
Columbia University faculty
American male non-fiction writers